Amans-Alexis Monteil (7 June 176920 February 1850), French historian, was born at Rodez, and died at Cely (Seine-et-Marne).

His tastes were historical, and he taught history at Rodez, at Fontainebleau and at St Cyr. He held that a disproportionate importance had been given to kings, their ministers and generals, and that it was necessary rather to study the people. In his  (10 vols, 1828–1844) he undertook to describe the different classes and occupations of the community.

He boasted of having been the first to write really "national" history, and he wished further to show this in a memoir entitled  (1840; reprinted in 1841 under the title).

Monteil did not invent the history of civilization, but he was one of the first in France, and perhaps in Europe, to point out its extreme importance. He revised the third edition of his history himself (5 vols, 1848); a fourth appeared after his death with a preface by Jules Janin (5 vols, 1853).

References

People from Rodez
1769 births
1850 deaths
19th-century French historians
19th-century French writers